Uboro Oro is an Oron community in Urue-Offong/Oruko local government area of Akwa Ibom state in Nigeria.

References 

Places in Oron Nation
Villages in Akwa Ibom